An architectural style is characterized by the features that make a building or other structure notable and historically identifiable. A style may include such elements as form, method of construction, building materials, and regional character. Most architecture can be classified as a chronology of styles which change over time reflecting changing fashions, beliefs and religions, or the emergence of new ideas, technology, or materials which make new styles possible.

Styles therefore emerge from the history of a society and are documented in the subject of architectural history. At any time several styles may be fashionable, and when a style changes it usually does so gradually, as architects learn and adapt to new ideas. Styles often spread to other places, so that the style at its source continues to develop in new ways while other countries follow with their own twist. A style may also spread through colonialism, either by foreign colonies learning from their home country, or by settlers moving to a new land. After a style has gone out of fashion, there are often revivals and re-interpretations. For instance, classicism has been revived many times and found new life as neoclassicism. Each time it is revived, it is different.

Vernacular architecture works slightly differently and is listed separately. It is the native method of construction used by local people, usually using labour-intensive methods and local materials, and usually for small structures such as rural cottages. It varies from region to region even within a country, and takes little account of national styles or technology. As western society has developed, vernacular styles have mostly become outmoded by new technology and national building standards.

Examples of styles

Chronology of styles

Prehistoric
Early civilizations developed, often independently, in scattered locations around the globe. The architecture was often a mixture of styles in timber cut from local forests and stone hewn from local rocks. Most of the timber has gone, although the earthworks remain. Impressively, massive stone structures have survived for years.
 Neolithic 10,000–3000 BC

Ancient Americas
 Mesoamerican
 Mezcala
 Talud-tablero
 Maya
 Western Native Americans

Mediterranean and Middle-East civilizations

 Phoenician 3000–500 BC
 Ancient Egyptian 3000 BC–373 BC
 Minoan 3000?+ BC (Crete)
 Knossos (Crete)
 Mycenaean 1600–1100 BC (Greece)

Ancient Near East and Mesopotamia
 Sumerian 5300–2000 BC

Iranian/Persian
 Ancient Persian
 Achaemenid
 Sassanid
 Iranian, c. 8th century+ (Iran)
 Persian Garden Style (Iran)
 Classical Style – Hayat
 Formal Style – Meidān (public) or Charbagh (private)
 Casual Style – Park (public) or Bāgh (private)
 Paradise garden

Ancient Asian

Indic 
 Bengalese
 Indian
 Indian rock-cut architecture
 Karnataka
 Tamil Nadu
 Pakistani
 Mauryan 321–185 BC (All India)
 Khmer
 Indonesian

Historic temple styles
 Buddhist Temple
 Hindu Temple
 Dravidian Architecture (South Indian temple style) 610 to present
 Nagara Style
 Māru-Gurjara architecture 900 to present (Rajasthan and Gujarat)
 Vesara Style (hybrid form of Indian temple architecture, with South Indian plan and a shape that features North Indian details)
 Badami Chalukya architecture

East Asian
 Ancient Chinese
 Japanese
 Korean

Also
 Harappan 3300–1600 BC
 Sikh

Classical Antiquity
The architecture of Ancient Greece and Ancient Rome, derived from the ancient Mediterranean civilizations such as at Knossos on Crete. They developed highly refined systems for proportions and style, using mathematics and geometry.
 Ancient Greek 776–265 BC
 Roman 753 BC–663 AD
 Etruscan 700–200 BC
 Classical 600 BC–323 AD
 Herodian 37–4 BC (Judea)
 Early Christian 100–500
 Byzantine 527–1520

Early Middle Ages
The European Early Middle Ages are generally taken to run from the end of the Roman Empire, around 400 AD, to around 1000 AD. During this period, Christianity made a significant impact on European culture.

Europe
 Latin Armenian 4th–16th centuries
 Anglo-Saxon 450s–1066 (England)
 Bulgarian from 681
 First Bulgarian Empire 681–1018
 Pre-Romanesque c. 700–1000 (Merovingian and Carolingian empires)
 Iberian pre-Romanesque
 Merovingian 5th–8th centuries (France, Germany, Italy and neighbouring locations)
 Visigothic 5th–8th centuries (Spain and Portugal)
 Asturian 711–910 (North Spain, North Portugal)
 Carolingian 780s–9th century (mostly France, Germany)
 Ottonian 950s–1050s (mostly Germany, also considered Early Romanesque)
 Repoblación 880s–11th century (Spain)

Medieval Europe
The dominance of the Church over everyday life was expressed in grand spiritual designs which emphasized piety and sobriety. The Romanesque style was simple and austere. The Gothic style heightened the effect with heavenly spires, pointed arches and religious carvings.

 Medieval

Byzantine
 Late Byzantine architecture before 1520 (see above)
 Kievan Rus' architecture 988–1237
 Tarnovo Artistic School 12th–14th century (Bulgaria)
 Rashka School 12th–15th centuries (Serbian principalities)
 Morava School (Serbian principalities/Bulgaria)

Romanesque
 Pre-Romanesque (see above)
 First Romanesque 1000–? (France, Italy, Spain)
 (including "Lombard Romanesque" in Italy)
 Romanesque 1000–1300
 Norman 1074–1250 (Normandy, UK, Ireland, South Italy and Sicily)
 Norman–Arab–Byzantine 1071–1200 (Sicily, Malta, South Italy)
 Cistercian Romanesque style c. 1120–c. 1240 (Europe)

Timber styles
 Stave churches, oldest 845(d) in England, in Norway one 11th century, several 12th century, some with Romanesque elements
 Timber frame styles, mostly Gothic or later (UK, France, Germany, the Netherlands)

Gothic
1135/40–1520
 Gothic
 Cistercian Gothic 1138–15th century (various European countries)
 Angevin Gothic or Plantagenet Style since 1148 (western France)
 Early English Period c. 1190–c. 1250
 Gotico Angioiano since 1266 (southern Italy)
 Decorated Period c. 1290–c. 1350
 Perpendicular Period c. 1350–c. 1550
 Rayonnant Gothic 1240–c. 1350 (France, Germany, Central Europe)
 Venetian Gothic 14th–15th centuries (Venice in Italy)
 Spanish Gothic
 Mudéjar Style c. 1200–1700 (Spain, Portugal, Latin America)
 Aragonese Mudéjar c. 1200–1700 (Aragon in Spain)
 Isabelline Gothic 1474–1505 (reign) (Spain)
 Plateresque 1490–1560 (Spain & colonies, bridging Gothic and Renaissance styles)
 Brick Gothic mid 13th to 16th century (Germany, Netherlands, Flanders, Poland, northern Europe)
 Brabantine Gothic (Belgium and Netherlands) 14th century
 Flamboyant Gothic 1400–1500 (Spain, France, Portugal)
 Manueline 1495–1521 (Portugal and colonies)

Asian architecture contemporary with the Dark Ages and medieval Europe

Japanese 
 Shinden-zukuri (Heian Period Japan)

Chinese 
 Songnic architecture

Korean 
 Hanok

Dravidian and Vesara temple styles (India)
 Badami Chalukya aka "Central Indian temple style" or "Deccan architecture" 450–700
 Rashtrakuta 750–983 (Central and South India)
 Western Chalukya aka Gadag 1050–1200 (Karnataka)
 Hoysala 900–1300 (Karnataka)
 Vijayanagara 1336–1565 (South India)

Other Indian styles
 Kalinga Architecture (Orissa and N Andhra Pradesh)
 Rekha Deula
 Pidha Deula
 Khakhara Deula
 Hemadpanthi 1200–? (Maharashtra)
 Sikh architecture

Islamic Architecture 620–1918
 Central Styles (Multi-Regional)
 Prophetic Era – based in Medina (c. 620–630)
 Rashidi Period – based in Medina (c. 630–660)
 Umayyad architecture – based in Damascus (c. 660–750)
 Abbasid architecture – based in Baghdad (c. 750–1256)
 Mamluk architecture – based in Cairo (c. 1256–1517)
 Ottoman architecture – based in Istanbul (c. 1517–1918)
 Regional Styles
 Egypt
 Early Islamic architecture (Rashidi + Umayyad) (641–750)
 Abbasid architecture (750–954)
 Fatimid architecture (954–1170)
 Ayyubid architecture (1174–1250)
 Mamluk architecture (1254–1517)
 Ottoman architecture (1517–1820)
 North Africa (Maghrib)
 The Umayyads (705–750)
 The Abbasid Era (750–909)
 The Fatimids (909–1048)
 The Amazigh Dynasties (1048–1550)
 Zirids 1048–1148 (Middle Maghreb)
 Almoravids 1040–1147 (Far Maghreb)
 Almohads 1121–1269 (Far Maghreb)
 Hafsids 1229–1574 (Near and Middle Maghreb)
 Marinids 1244–1465 (Middle and Far Maghreb)
 Zayyanids 1235–1550 (Middle Maghreb)
 Ottoman Rule 1550–1830 (Near and Middle Maghreb)
 Local Dynasties 1549–present (Far Maghreb)
 Islamic Spain
 Umayyad architecture (756–1031)
 Taifa Kingdoms-1 (1031–1090)
 Almoravid architecture (1090–1147)
 Taifa Kingdoms-2 (1140–1203)
 Almohad architecture (1147–1238),
 Taifa Kingdoms-3 (1232–1492)
 Granada architecture (1287–1492)
 Persia and Central Asia
 Khurasani architecture (Late 7th–10th century)
 Razi Style (10th–13th century)
 Samanid Period (10th c.)
 Ghaznawid Period (11th c.)
 Saljuk Period (11th–12th c.)
 Mongol Period (13th c.)
 Timurid Style (14th–16th c.)
 Isfahani Style (17th–19th c.)
 Indian subcontinent
 Indo-Islamic architecture (1204–1857)
 Mughal architecture (1526–1707)
 Turkey
 Seljuk architecture (1071–1299)
 Ottoman architecture (1299–1922)
 First national architectural movement (1908–1940)

American architecture contemporary with the Dark and Middle Ages 
 Puuc
 Maya
 Aztec (ca. 14th century – 1521)

The Renaissance and its successors

1425–1660. The Renaissance began in Italy and spread through Europe, rebelling against the all-powerful Church, by placing Man at the centre of his world instead of God. The Gothic spires and pointed arches were replaced by classical domes and rounded arches, with comfortable spaces and entertaining details, in a celebration of humanity. The Baroque style was a florid development of this 200 years later, largely by the Catholic Church to restate its religious values.

 Renaissance c. 1425–1600 (Europe, American colonies)
 Central European Renaissance
 Polish Renaissance
 French Renaissance
 Eastern European Renaissance
 Palladian 1516–1580 (Venezia, Italy; revived in UK)
 Mannerism 1520–1600
 Polish Mannerism 1550–1650
 Brâncovenesc style late 17th and early 18th centuries
 Eastern Orthodox Church 1400?+ (Southeast and Eastern Europe)

France
 Henry II 1530–1590
 Louis XIII 1601–1643

United Kingdom
 Tudor 1485–1603
 Elizabethan 1480–1620?
 Jacobean 1580–1660

Spain and Portugal
 Asturian pre-romanesque 711 - 910 (Kingdom of Asturias)
 Mudéjar Art 13th and 16th centuries
 Spanish Renaissance 15th and 16th centuries
 Plateresque continued from Spanish Gothic – 1560 (Spain & colonies, Low Countries)
 Herrerian 1550–1650 (Spain & colonies, primarily in Castille and the surroundings of Madrid)
 Barroque Churrigueresque 17th – 1750 (Hispanic countries, primarily in Spain and Mexico)
 Modernisme 1880s - 1910s (Primarily Catalonia, but also in Valencian Community, Majorca Island and Melilla)
 Portuguese Renaissance
 Portuguese Plain style 1580–1640 (Portugal & colonies)

Colonial
 Portuguese Colonial c. 1480–1820 (Brazil, India, Macao, Africa, East Timor)
 Spanish Colonial 1520s – c. 1820s (New World, East Indies, other colonies)
 Cape Dutch 1652–1802 (Cape Colony, South Africa)
 Indies Empire mid-18th century–late 19th century (Dutch East Indies)
 Dutch Colonial 1615–1674 (Treaty of Westminster) (New England)
 Chilotan 1600+ (Chiloé and southern Chile)
 First Period 1625–1725 pre-American vernacular
 Architecture of the California missions 1769–1823, (California, US)
 French Colonial
 Colonial Georgian architecture

Baroque
1600–1800, up to 1900
 Andean Baroque, 1680–1780 (Viceroyalty of Peru)
 Baroque c. 1600–1750 (Europe, the Americas)
 English Baroque 1666 (Great Fire) – 1713 (Treaty of Utrecht)
 Spanish Baroque c. 1600–1760
 Churrigueresque, 1660s–1750s (Spain & New World), revival 1915+ (southwest US, Hawaii)
 Earthquake Baroque, 17th–18th centuries (Philippines)
 Maltese Baroque c. 1635–1798
 New Spanish Baroque, mid-17th-early-18th centuries (New Spain)
 French Baroque c. 1650–1789
 Dutch Baroque c. 1650–1700
 Sicilian Baroque 1693 earthquake – c. 1745
 Portuguese Joanine baroque c. 1700–1750
 Russian Baroque (c. 1680–1750)
 Naryshkin Baroque c. 1690–1720 (Moscow, Russian Empire)
 Petrine Baroque c. 1700–1745 (Saint Petersburg, Russian Empire)
 Elizabethan Baroque 1736–1762 (Russian Empire)
 Ukrainian Baroque late 17th–18th centuries (Ukrainian lands)
 Rococo c. 1720–1789 (France, Germany, Austria, Italy, Russia, Spain)

Asian architecture contemporary with Renaissance and post-Renaissance Europe

Japanese 
 Shoin-zukuri (1560s–1860s)
 Sukiya-zukuri (1530s–present)
 Minka (Japanese commoner or folk architecture)
 Gassho-zukuri (Edo period and later)
 Honmune-zukuri (Edo period and later)
 Imperial Crown Style (1919–1945)
 Giyōfū architecture (1800s)

Indian
 Indo-Islamic
 Mughal 1540–? (India, Pakistan, Bangladesh)
 Akbari
 Mughal Garden Style
 Sharqi aka Janpur Style

Neoclassicism
1720–1837 and onward. A time often depicted as a rural idyll by the great painters, but in fact was a hive of early industrial activity, with small kilns and workshops springing up wherever materials could be mined or manufactured. After the Renaissance, neoclassical forms were developed and refined into new styles for public buildings and the gentry.

New Cooperism

Neoclassical
 Neoclassical c. 1715–1820
 Beaux-Arts 1670+ (France) and 1880 (US)
 Georgian 1720–1840s (UK, US)
 Jamaican Georgian architecture c. 1750 – c. 1850 (Jamaica)
 American Colonial 1720–1780s (US)
 Pombaline style 1755 – c. 1860 (Lisbon in Portugal)
 Josephinischer Stil 1760–1780/90 (Austria)
 Adam style 1760–1795 (England, Scotland, Russia, US)
 Federal 1780–1830 (US)
 Empire 1804–1830, revival 1870 (Europe, US)
 Regency 1811–1830 (UK)
 Antebellum 1812–1861 (Southern United States)
 Palazzo Style 1814–1930? (Europe, Australia, US)
 Neo-Palladian
 Jeffersonian 1790s–1830s (Virginia in US)
 American Empire 1810
 Greek Revival architecture
 Rundbogenstil 1835–1900 (Germany)
 Neo-Grec 1845–65 (UK, US, France)
 Nordic Classicism 1910–30 (Norway, Sweden, Denmark & Finland)
 Polish Neoclassicism (Poland)
 New Classical architecture 20th/21st century (global)
 Temple 1832+ (global)

Revivalism and Orientalism
Late 19th and early 20th centuries. The Victorian Era was a time of giant leaps forward in technology and society, such as iron bridges, aqueducts, sewer systems, roads, canals, trains, and factories. As engineers, inventors, and businessmen they reshaped much of the British Empire, including the UK, India, Australia, South Africa, and Canada, and influenced Europe and the United States. Architecturally, they were revivalists who modified old styles to suit new purposes.

 Revivalism
 Resort architecture (Germany)
 Victorian 1837–1901 (UK)
 See also San Francisco architecture
 Edwardian 1901–1910 (UK)

Revivals started before the Victorian Era
 Gothic Revival 1740s+ (UK, US, Europe)
 Scots Baronial (UK)
 Italianate 1802–1890 (UK, Europe, US)
 Egyptian Revival 1809–1820s, 1840s, 1920s (Europe, US)
 Biedermeier 1815–1848 (Central Europe)
 Russian Revival 1826–1917 (Russian Empire, Germany, Middle Asia)
 Russo-Byzantine style 1861–1917 (Russian Empire, Balkans)
 Russian neoclassical revival 1900–1920 (Russian Empire)

Victorian revivals
 Renaissance Revival 1840–1890 (UK)
 Timber frame revivals in various styles (Europe)
 Black-and-white Revival 1811+ (UK especially Chester)
 Jacobethan 1830–1870 (UK)
 Tudorbethan aka Mock Tudor 1835–1885+ (UK)
 Baroque Revival aka Neo-Baroque 1840?-
 Bristol Byzantine 1850–1880
 Edwardian Baroque 1901–1922 (UK & British Empire)
 Second Empire 1855–1880 (France, UK, US, Canada, Australia)
 Napoleon III style 1852–1870 (Paris, France)
 Queen Anne Style 1870–1910s (UK, US)
 Romanian Revival 1884-1920s (Romania)

Orientalism
 Orientalism
 Neo-Mudéjar 1880s–1920s (Spain, Portugal, Bosnia, California)
 Moorish Revival (US, Europe)
 Egyptian Revival 1920s (Europe, US; see above)
 Mayan Revival 1920–1930s (US)
 Indo-Saracenic Revival aka Hindu Style, Indo-Gothic, Mughal-Gothic, Neo-Mughal, Hindu-Gothic late 19th century (British India, aka The Raj)

Revivals in North America
 Romanesque Revival 1840–1930s (US)
 Gothic Revival (see above)
 Carpenter Gothic 1870+ (US)
 High Victorian Gothic (English-speaking world)
 Collegiate Gothic, 1910–1960 (US)
 Stick Style 1860–1890+ (US)
 Queen Anne Style architecture (United States) 1880–1910s (US)
 Eastlake Style 1879–1905 (US)
 Richardsonian Romanesque 1880s–1905 (US)
 Shingle Style 1879–1905
 Neo-Byzantine 1882–1920s (US)
 Renaissance Revival
 American Renaissance
 Châteauesque 1887–1930s (Canada, US, Hungary)
 Canadian Chateau 1880s–1920s (Canada)
 Mediterranean Revival 1890s+ (US, Latin America, Europe)
 Mission Revival 1894–1936; (California, southwest US)
 Pueblo Revival 1898–1930+ (southwest US)
 Colonial Revival 1890s+
 Dutch Colonial Revival c. 1900 (New England)
 Spanish Colonial Revival 1915+ (Mexico, California, Hawaii, Florida, southwest US)
 Beaux-Arts Revival 1880+ (US, Canada), 1920+ (Australia)
 City Beautiful 1890–20th century (US)
 Territorial Revival architecture 1930+

Other late 19th century styles
 Australian styles
 Queenslander 1840s–1960s (Australian)
 Federation 1890–1920 (Australian)
 Heimatstil 1870–1900 (Austria, Germany, Switzerland
 Neoclásico Isabelino 1843–1897 (Ponce, Puerto Rico)
 Neo-Manueline 1840s–1910s (Portugal, Brazil, Portuguese colonies)
 Dragestil 1880s–1910s (Norway)
 Palazzo style architecture
 Neo-Plateresque and Monterrey Style 19th-early 20th centuries (Spain, Mexico)

Rural styles
 Swiss chalet style 1840s–1920s+ (Scandinavia, Austria, Germany, later global)
 Adirondack 1850s (New York, US)
 National Park Service rustic aka Parkitecture 1903+ (US)
 Western false front (Western United States)

Reactions to the Industrial Revolution

Industrial
 Industrial, 1760–present (worldwide)

Arts and Crafts in Europe
 Arts and Crafts 1880–1910 (UK)
 Art Nouveau aka Jugendstil 1885–1910
 Modernisme 1888–1911 (Catalan Art Nouveau)
 Glasgow Style 1890–1910 (Glasgow, Scotland)
 Vienna Secession 1897–1905 (Austrian Art Nouveau)
 National Romantic style 1900–1923? (Norway, Sweden, Denmark & Finland)

Arts and Crafts in the US
 American Craftsman, aka American Arts and Crafts 1890s–1930 (US)
 Prairie Style 1900–1917 (US)
 American Foursquare mid-1890s – late 1930s (US)
 California Bungalow 1910–1939 (US, Australia, then global)

Modernism and other styles contemporary with modernism
1880 onwards. The Industrial Revolution had brought steel, plate glass, and mass-produced components. These enabled a brave new world of bold structural frames, with clean lines and plain or shiny surfaces. In the early stages, a popular motto was "decoration is a crime". In the Eastern Bloc the Communists rejected the Western Bloc's 'decadent' ways, and modernism developed in a markedly more bureaucratic, sombre, and monumental fashion.

 Avant-garde
 Parametricism 2008+
 Russian avant-garde 1890–1930 (Russian Empire/Soviet Union)
 Chicago School 1880–1920, 1940s–1960s (US)
 Functionalism c. 1900 – 1930s (Europe, US)
 Futurism 1909 (Europe)
 Expressionism 1910 – c. 1924
 Amsterdam School 1912–1924 (Netherlands)
 Organic architecture
 New Objectivity 1920–1939 (Italy, Germany, Holland, Budapest)
 Rationalism 1920s–1930s (Italy)
 Bauhaus 1919–1930+ (Germany, Northern Europe)
 De Stijl 1920s (Holland, Europe)
 Moderne 1925+ (global)
 Art Deco 1925–1940s (global)
 List of Art Deco architecture
 Streamline Moderne 1930–1937
 Modernism 1927–1960s
 International Style 1930+ (Europe, US)
 Usonian 1936–1940s (US)

Modernism under communism
 Constructivism 1925–1932 (USSR)
 Postconstructivism 1932–1941 (USSR)
 Stalinist 1933–1955 (USSR)

Fascist/Nazi
 Fascist architecture
 Nazi 1933–1944 (Germany)

Post-Second World War
1945–
 Modernism (continued)
 International Style (continued)
 New towns 1946–1968+ (UK, global)
 Mid-century modern 1950s (California, etc.)
 Googie 1950s (US)
 Brutalism 1950s–1970s
 Structuralism 1950s–1970s
 Megastructures 1960s
 Metabolist 1959 (Japan)
 Danish Functionalism 1960s (Denmark)
 Structural Expressionism aka Hi-Tech 1980s+

Other 20th century styles
 Heimatschutz Architecture 1900–1940 (Austria, Germany)
 Ponce Creole 1895–1920 (Ponce in Puerto Rico)
 Heliopolis style 1905 – c. 1935 (Egypt)
 Mar del Plata style 1935–1950 (Mar del Plata, Argentina)
 Minimal Traditional 1930s–1940s (US)
 Soft Portuguese 1940–1955 (Portugal & colonies)
 Ranch-style 1940s–1970s (US)
 Jengki style (Indonesia)

Postmodernism and early 21st century styles
 Postmodernism 1945+ (US, UK)
 Bowellism
 Shed Style
 Arcology 1970s+ (Europe)
 Deconstructivism 1982+ (Europe, US, Far East)
 Critical regionalism 1983+
 Blobitecture 2003+
 High-tech 1970s+
 Hostile 2008+ (global)
 Interactive architecture 2000+
 Sustainable architecture 2000+
 Earthship 1980+ (Started in US, now global)
 Green building 2000+
 Natural building 2000+
 Neo-Andean 2005+
 Neo-futurism late 1960s-early 21st century
 New Classical Architecture 1980+
 New London Vernacular 2009+
 Berlin Style 1990s+

Fortified styles
 Fortification 6800 BC+
 Ringfort 800 BC – 400 AD
 Dzong 17th century+
 Star fort 1530–1800?
 Polygonal fort 1850?-

Vernacular styles

 Vernacular architecture

Generic methods
 Natural building
 Ice – Igloo, quinzhee
 Earth – Cob house, sod house, adobe, mudbrick house, rammed earth
 Timber – Log cabin, log house, Carpenter Gothic, roundhouse, stilt house
 Nomadic structures – Yaranga, bender tent
 Temporary structures – Quonset hut, Nissen hut, prefabricated home
 Underground – Underground living, rock-cut architecture, monolithic church, pit-house
 Modern low-energy systems – Straw-bale construction, earthbag construction, rice-hull bagwall construction, earthship, earth house
 Various styles – Longhouse

European
 European Arctic (North Norway and Sweden, Finland, North Russia) – Sami lavvu, Sami goahti
 Northwest Europe (Norway, Sweden, Fresia, Jutland, Denmark, North Poland, UK, Iceland) – Norse architecture, heathen hofs, Viking ring fortress, fogou, souterrain, Grubenhaus (also known as Grubhouse or Grubhut)
 Central and Eastern Europe – Burdei, zemlyanka
 Bulgaria – Rock-hewn Churches of Ivanovo
 Estonia
 Germany – Black Forest house, Swiss chalet style, Gulf house (aka East Frisian house), Geestharden house (aka Cimbrian house, Schleswig house), Haubarg, Low German house (aka Low Saxon house), Middle German house, Reed house, Seaside resort house, Ständerhaus, Uthland-Frisian house
 Holland – Frisian farmhouse, Old Frisian longhouse, Bildts farmhouse
 Iceland – Turf houses
 Ireland – Clochán, Crannog
 Italy – Trullo
 Lithuania – Kaunas modernism, Lithuanian folk architecture, Polish-Lithuanian wooden synagogues
 Norway – Architecture of Norway: Post church, Palisade church, Stave church, Norwegian Turf house, Vernacular architecture in Norway, Rorbu, Dragestil, also National Romantic style, Swiss chalet style and Nordic Classicism buildings
 Poland – Zakopane, Polish-Lithuanian wooden synagogues, wooden churches of Southern Lesser Poland, Upper Lusatian house
 Romania – Carpathian vernacular, wooden churches of Maramureș
 Russia – Dacha
 Scotland – Medieval turf building in Cronberry, blackhouses
 Slovakia – Wooden churches of the Slovak Carpathians
 Spain – Asturian teito, Asturian hórreo, Gallician palloza
 Ukraine – Wooden churches
 United Kingdom – Dartmoor longhouse, Neolithic long house, palisade church, mid-20th-century system-built houses
 Scotland – Broch, Atlantic roundhouse, crannog, dun

North American
 Shotgun house (US)
 Florida Cracker c. 1800+ (Florida, US)
 Tidewater (US)
 Sibley tent (US)
 Sod house (US)
 Cape Cod (New England, US)
 Saltbox (New England, US)
 Farmhouse (US)
 Brownstone (US)

Native American
 Navajo hogan
 Pacific northwest plank house
 Plains nations tipi and earth lodge
 Wigwam
 Northeast nations wetu
 Pueblo kiva
 Colombian plateau nations quiggly hole
 Southwest nations jacal
 Southwestern cliff dwellings
 Seminole chickee
 Sweat lodge, temazcal
 Amerindian longhouses

South American
 Argentina – Mar del Plata style
 Chile – Chilotan architecture
 Venezuela and Chile – Palafito

African
 Central and South African countries – Rondavel, Xhosa and Zulu Architecture, Zimbabwean Architecture, Sotho-Tswana Architecture, Zulu and Nguni Architecture, and Madagascan Architecture
 Dutch Colonial, Cape Dutch

Asian
 China
 Yaodong
 Siheyuan
 Tulou
 Shanxi
 Hokkien
 Cantonese
 Hui
 Hakka
 Jiangxi
 Sichuan
 Pang uk (Architecture of Hong Kong)
 India – Rock-cut, Toda hut
 Indonesia – Uma longhouse, attap dwelling
 Iran, Turkey – Caravanserai
 Iran – Yakhchal
 Israel – Rock-cut tombs
 Japan – Minka
 Mongolia – Yurt
 Papua New Guinea – Papua New Guinea stilt house
 Philippines – Bahay kubo, Jin-jin, Torogan, Bale
 Russia – Siberian chum
 Thailand – Thai stilt house

Australasian
 Australia, New Zealand – slab hut
 Australia – Aborigine humpy

Alphabetical listing

 Adam style 1770 England
 Adirondack Architecture 1850s New York, US
 Anglo-Saxon architecture 450s–1066 England and Wales
 American colonial architecture 1720–1780s US
 American Craftsman 1890s–1930 US, California & east
 American Empire 1810
 American Foursquare mid. 1890s-late 1930s US
 Amsterdam School 1912–1924 Netherlands
 Ancient Egyptian architecture 3000 BC – 373 AD
 Ancient Greek architecture 776 BC – 265 BC
 Angevin Gothic since 1148, western France
 Arcology 1970s AD–present
 Art Deco 1925–1940s Europe & US
 Art Nouveau c. 1885–1910
 1880s–1920s; UK, California, US
 Australian architectural styles
 Baroque architecture
 Bauhaus
 Berlin style 1990s+
 Biedermeier 1815–1848
 Blobitecture 2003–present
 Bowellism 1957–present
 Brick Gothic c. 1350 – c. 15th century
 Bristol Byzantine 1850–1880
 Brownstone
 Brutalist architecture 1950s–1970s
 Buddhist architecture 1st century BC
 Byzantine architecture 527 AD (Sofia) – 1520
 Cape Cod 17th century
 Carolingian architecture 780s–9th century; France and Germany
 Carpenter Gothic US and Canada 1840s on
 Chicago school 1880s and 1890 US
 Chilotan architecture 1600–present Chiloé and southern Chile
 Churrigueresque, 1660s–1750s;  Spain and the New World
 City Beautiful movement 1890–20th century US
 Classical architecture 600 BC – 323 AD
 Colonial Revival architecture
 Constructivist architecture
 Danish Functionalism 1960s AD Denmark
 Deconstructivism 1982–present
 Decorated Period c. 1290 – c. 1350
 Dragestil 1880s–1910s, Norway
 Dutch Colonial 1615–1674 (Treaty of Westminster) New England
 Dutch Colonial Revival c. 1900 New England
 Early English Period c. 1190 – c. 1250
 Eastlake Style 1879–1905 New England
 Egyptian Revival architecture 1809–1820s, 1840s, 1920s      
 Elizabethan architecture (1533–1603)
 Empire 1804–1814, 1870 revival
 English Baroque 1666 (Great Fire) – 1713 (Treaty of Utrecht)
 Expressionist architecture 1910 – c. 1924
 Farmhouse
 Federal architecture 1780–1830 US
 Federation architecture 1890–1915 Australia
 Florida cracker architecture c. 1800 – present Florida, US
 Florida modern 1950s or Tropical Modern
 Functionalism c. 1900 – 1930s Europe & US
 Futurist architecture 1909 Europe
 Georgian architecture 1720–1840s UK & US
 Googie architecture 1950s US and Canada
 Gothic architecture
 Gothic Revival architecture 1760s–1840s
 Gotico Angioiano, since 1266, southern Italy
 Greek Revival architecture
 Green building 2000–present
 Heliopolis style 1905 – c. 1935 Egypt
 Indian architecture India
 Interactive architecture 2000–present
 International style 1930–present
 Isabelline Gothic 1474–1505 (reign) Spain
 Islamic Architecture 691–present
 Italianate architecture 1802
 Jacobean architecture 1580–1660
 Jacobethan 1838
 Jeffersonian architecture 1790s–1830s Virginia, US
 Jengki style 1950s Indonesia
 Jugendstil c. 1885–1910 German term for Art Nouveau

 Manueline 1495–1521 (reign) Portugal and colonies
 Mediterranean Revival Style 1890s–present; US, Latin America, Europe
 Memphis Group 1981–1988
 Merovingian architecture 5th–8th centuries; France and Germany
 Metabolist Movement 1959 Japan
 Mid-century modern 1950s–1960s California, US, Latin America
 Mission Revival Style architecture 1894–1936; California, US
 Modern movement 1927–1960s
 Modernisme 1888–1911 Catalan Art Nouveau
 National Park Service Rustic 1872–present US
 Natural building 2000–
 Nazi architecture 1933–1944 Germany
 Neo-Byzantine architecture 1882–1920s American
 Neoclassical architecture
 Neo-Grec 1848–1865
 Neo-gothic architecture
 Neolithic architecture 10,000–3000 BC
 Neo-Manueline 1840s–1910s AD Portugal and Brazil
 New towns 1946–1968 United Kingdom
 Norman architecture 1074–1250
 Organic architecture
 Ottonian architecture 950s–1050s Germany
 Palladian architecture 1616–1680 (Jones)
 Perpendicular Period c. 1350 – c. 1550
 Plantagenet Style since 1148, western France
 Southern plantation architecture
 Ponce Creole 1895–1920 Ponce, Puerto Rico
 Pombaline style 1755 earthquake – c. 1860 Portugal
 Postmodern architecture 1980s
 Polish Cathedral Style 1870–1930
 Polite architecture
 Prairie Style 1900–1917 US
 Pueblo style 1898ЕкУР
–1990s
 Shingle Style 1879–1905 New England
 Queen Anne Style architecture 1870–1910s UK and US
 Queenslander 1840s–1960s
 Ranch-style 1940s–1970s US
 Repoblación architecture 880s–11th century; Spain
 Regency architecture
 Richardsonian Romanesque 1880s US
 Rococo
 Roman architecture 753 BC – 663 AD
 Romanesque architecture 1050–1100
 Romanesque Revival architecture 1840–1900 US
 Russian architecture 989 – 18th century
 Russian Revival 1826–1917, 1990s–present
 Saltbox
 San Francisco architecture
 Scottish Baronial
 Second Empire 1865–1880
 Serbo-Byzantine revival Interwar period
 Sicilian Baroque 1693 earthquake – c. 1745
 Soft Portuguese style 1940–1955 Portugal & colonies
 Spanish Colonial Revival style 1915–present; California, Hawaii, Florida, Southwest US
 Spanish Colonial style 1520s – c. 1820s; New World, East Indies, other colonies
  c. 1900–present; California, Florida, US, Latin America, Spain.
 Stalinist architecture 1933–1955 USSR
 Stave churches, oldest 845(d) in England, Norway one 11th century, several 12th century
 Stick Style 1860–1890s
 Storybook 1920s
 Streamline Moderne 1930–1937
 Structural Expressionism 1980s–present
 Structuralism 1950–1975
 Sumerian architecture 5300 – 2000 BC
 Sustainable architecture 2000–present
 Swiss chalet style 1840s–1920s, Scandinavia and Germany
 Tidewater architecture 19th century
 Tudor architecture 1485–1603
 Tudorbethan architecture 1835–1885
 Ukrainian Baroque late 1600 – 19th century
 Usonian 1936–1940s US
 Victorian architecture 1837–1901 UK
 Vienna Secession 1897 – c. 1905 Austrian Art Nouveau

See also
 National Register of Historic Places architectural style categories
 Architectural design values
 Feminism and modern architecture
 List of house styles
 Sacred architecture
 Architecture of cathedrals and great churches
 Synagogue architecture
 Timeline of architecture
 Timeline of architectural styles
 Parametricism

References

 
 Lewis, Philippa; Gillian Darley (1986). Dictionary of Ornament, NY: Pantheon
 Baker, John Milnes, AIA (1994) American House Styles, NY: Norton

Further reading
 Hamlin Alfred Dwight Foster, History of Architectural Styles, BiblioBazaar, 2009
 Carson Dunlop, Architectural Styles, Dearborn Real Estate, 2003
 Herbert Pothorn, A guide to architectural styles, Phaidon, 1983

External links

 Victoria & Albert Museum Microsite on Introduction to Architectural Styles

 01
Architectural design
Architectural history